Ben Kohles (born February 24, 1990) is an American professional golfer who has played on the PGA Tour and Web.com Tour.

Kohles was born in Dallas, Texas. He played college golf at the University of Virginia where he won five events and was a three-time All-American and twice was ACC Player of the Year.

Kohles turned professional in July 2012 and won the first professional event he entered, the Nationwide Children's Hospital Invitational on the Web.com Tour. He won in a playoff over Luke Guthrie, with a birdie at the first extra hole to take victory. He was invited to the tournament because of his collegiate All-American status. He became the first player to win on his Web.com Tour debut since 2007 and the thirteenth overall that have achieved the feat; he is also the first without prior professional tournament experience. Kohles then won the following week at the Cox Classic, shooting a final round 62 to take the title by three shots. He became the first player in the history of the tour to win both of the first two tournaments he played. The win moved him to second on the Web.com Tour money list, which guaranteed that he would finish in the top 25 on the tour and receive a PGA Tour card for 2013.

Kohles made his PGA Tour debut at the 2012 Wyndham Championship. Kohles was unable to maintain his Tour privileges and was playing on the third-tier PGA Tour Latinoamérica in 2016.

Amateur wins (1)
 2012 Dogwood Invitational

Professional wins (2)

Web.com Tour wins (2)

Web.com Tour playoff record (1–0)

See also
2012 Web.com Tour graduates
2021 Korn Ferry Tour Finals graduates

References

External links
 
 
 

American male golfers
Virginia Cavaliers men's golfers
PGA Tour golfers
PGA Tour Latinoamérica golfers
Korn Ferry Tour graduates
Golfers from Dallas
1990 births
Living people